Erika Bodnár (born 17 March 1948) is a Hungarian actress. She appeared in more than fifty films since 1966.

Selected filmography

References

External links 

1948 births
Living people
Hungarian film actresses